Five Variants of Dives and Lazarus is a work for harp and string orchestra by Ralph Vaughan Williams.  The composition is based on the folk tune "Dives and Lazarus", one of the folk songs quoted in Vaughan Williams' English Folk Song Suite.

Background
Vaughan Williams composed the work on commission from the British Council to be played at the 1939 World's Fair in New York City.  The first performance was by the New York Philharmonic at Carnegie Hall on 10 June 1939, conducted by Sir Adrian Boult. The other works premiered on that occasion were Arthur Bliss's Piano Concerto in B-flat, and Arnold Bax's Symphony No. 7.

Boult also directed the first UK performance in November 1939 in Bristol.

The folk tune had earlier been arranged by Vaughan Williams
 
as a hymn tune "Kingsfold" appearing as "I Heard the Voice of Jesus Say" in The English Hymnal (no. 574 in the original 1906 edition). The village of Kingsfold is in West Sussex, a few miles south from Vaughan Williams' home at Leith Hill.

Sections
The structure, key and tempo markings for the work are as follows:
 Introduction and Theme: Adagio, B modal minor
 Variant I: B modal minor
 Variant II: Allegro moderato, B modal minor
 Variant III: D modal minor
 Variant IV: L'istesso tempo
 Variant V: Adagio, B modal minor

Reception
The Five Variants is at no 56 in the 2021 Classic FM Hall of Fame.

In film
The 1949 documentary film The Dim Little Island (dir. Humphrey Jennings) features extracts from this work, together with the voice of Vaughan Williams himself. At one point a solo folk singer begins the tune—and the string arrangement gradually fades up beneath him.

The concluding bars of the work feature in the 2001 film Enigma, as played by the Bletchley Park orchestra in an outdoor concert. The chord structure of the concluding bars is similar in form to the musical themes of the film's score, as composed by John Barry.

The piece is used at the start of the 2010 film Cemetery Junction.

References

Further reading

External links
 Kingsfold (hymn tune) hymnary.org website

1939 compositions
Compositions by Ralph Vaughan Williams
Compositions for string orchestra
Compositions in B minor
Variations